Hıfzı Topuz (born 25 January 1923) is a Turkish journalist, travel writer and novelist. He also served as a lecturer on journalism at several universities.

Early life
Hıfzı Topuz was born 1923 in Istanbul. After finishing his secondary education at the Galatasaray High School in 1942, he studied law at Istanbul University, graduating in 1948. Later, he went to France, where he attended University of Strasbourg to conduct further studies in international law and journalism between 1957 and 1959. In 1960, he earned a doctoral degree in journalism from the same university.

Professional career
After graduating from Istanbul University, Hıfzı Topuz entered journalism, and was employed between 1948 and 1957 at the daily newspaper Akşam, where he worked as a reporter and later as an editor. He co-founded Istanbul Journalists' Union, and served as its leader.

During his time in France, he applied for a vacant post at the headquarters of UNESCO in Paris. He worked as a travelling reporter for the organization between 1959 and 1983. He was responsible for projects like professional coordination between international organizations of journalism, journalism ethics and standards, journalism education and security of journalists. Topuz conducted seminars on journalism education in African countries, India and the Philippines. He developed rural area journalism project in Black Africa.

While in Paris, Topuz interviewed for the Turkish daily newspapers notable people like painter Fikret Mualla (1903–1967), poet Nazım Hikmet (1902–1963), journalist Zekeriya Sertel (1890–1980), painter Abidin Dino (1913–1993)), painter Nejat Devrim (1923–1995) and General Nikolaos Trikoupis (1869–1956), who commanded Greek troops during the Turkish War of Independence and became a prisoner of war.

Topuz planned in 1962 at the headquarters of UNESCO a project to establish the "College of Communications" (as its title then ) at the University of Ankara.

Invited by İsmail Cem İpekçi, the newly appointed head of the state-owned Turkish Radio and Television Corporation (TRT), he returned in 1974 to Turkey to lead the radio channels of TRT until 1975.

He founded in 1986 the "İletişim Araştırmaları Derneği" (İLAD) (literally: Communications Research Association), whose president he still is.

Topuz wrote for the daily newspapers Vatan, Milliyet and Cumhuriyet and some magazines.

He taught lectures on press, history of radio-television, international communication and political communication at the communications faculties of Anadolu University, Galatasaray University and Istanbul University.

Writer
Hıfzı Topuz wrote non-fiction on communications in addition to biographies, travel books and novels. He opened a new field in the Turkish literature by choosing the subject matters of his novels from history or historical figures.

Awards
Hıfzı Topuz was honored in 1998 with the "Sertel Demokrasi Ödülü" (Sertel Democracy Award). He received in 2007 the "Orhan Kemal Roman Armağanı" (Orhan Kemal Novel Prize) for his work Başın Öne Eğilmesin. The "Afrika Diplomatik Akademisi" (ADA) (Africa Diplomatic Academy) awarded him in 2008 with its "Peace and Friendship Prize". In 2009, the "Çağdaş Gazetecier Derneği" (Association of Contemporary Journalists) awarded him with its "Honor Prize".

Bibliography
Non-fiction
Basin sözlüğü: Fransızcadan Türkçeye Fransızcaya, İngilizce karşılıklı (1968) Yenilik Basımevi, 111pp
100 soruda Türk basın tarihi (1973) Gerc̦ek Yayınev, 270pp
Seçim savaşları: televizyon, radyo, basın ve afişle (1977) Milliyet, 134pp
Uluslararası İletişim (1984) Anadolu Üniversitesi, 243pp
Cumhuriyetʹin beş dönemeci (with Hüsamettin Ünsal) (1984) Sergi Yayınevi, 199pp
İletişimde karikatür ve toplum (1986) Anadolu Üniversitesi, 109pp
Basında tekelleşmeler (1989) İLAD, 111pp
Yarının radyo ve televizyon düzeni: özgür, özerk ve çoğulcu bir alternatif (1990) İLAD, 191pp
Türkiye'de sec̦im kampanyaları (1991) Türkiye Sosyal Ekonomik Siyasal Araștırmalar Vakfı, 85pp
Siyasal reklamcılık: dünyadan ve Türkiye'den örneklerle (1991) Cem Yayınevi, 248pp , 
Seçimlerde iletişim politikaları (1991) TüSES, 230pp
Kara Afrika sanatı (1992) Ant, 96pp
Türk Basın Tarihi: II. Mahmut'tan holdinglere (1996) Remzi Kitabevi, 470pp 
Başlangıcından Bugüne Dünya Karikatürü (1997) İnkılâp Kitabevi, 264pp
Dünyada ve Türkiye'de kültür politikaları (1998) Adam, 86pp

Biographies
Konuklar geçiyor: TV'de "Her hafta bir konuk" programındaki konuşmalar, anılar (1975) Çağdaş Yayınları, 237pp 
Lumumba: Kara Afrikd̓a işkenceyle öldürülen ilk Başbakan (1987) Yön Yayıncılık, 199pp 
Paris'te son Osmanlılar: Mediha Sultan ve Damat Ferit (1999) Remzi Kitabevi (reprint 2005), 302pp , 
Hatice Sultan (2001) Remzi Kitabevi, 246pp , 
Nâzïm Hikmet: vivre comme un arbre, seul et libre, vivre en frères comme les arbres d'une forêt (2002) Turquoise, 335pp
Gazi ve Fikriye (2006) Edition Orient, 286pp , 
Fikret Muallâ: anılar, resimler, fotoğraflar (2005) Everest Yayınları, 359pp , 
Abidin Dino: İkinci kitap, 1942-1952 (2008) Kitap Yayınevi
Abdülmecit: İmparatorluk Çökerken Sarayda 22 Yıl (2009) Remzi Kitabevi, 205pp
Bana Atatürk'ü anlattılar (2010) Remzi Kitabevi, 167pp , 

Travel books
Kara Afrika (1971) Milliyet yayınları, 348pp
Parisli yıllar (1994) Bilgi Yayinevi, 302pp
Elveda Afrika-Hoşça Kal Paris (2005) Remzi Kitabevi, 462pp 
Nişantaşı Anıları (2009) Heyamola Yayınları, 134pp , 

Novels
Taif’te Ölüm (2000) Remzi Kitabevi, 255pp , 
Meyyâle (1998) Remzi Kitabevi (reprint 2001), 224pp , 
Eski Dostlar  (2000) Remzi Kitabevi, 270pp
Milli Mücadele'de Çamlıca'nın üç gülü (2002) Remzi Kitabevi, 287pp , 
Devrim yılları (2004) Remzi kitabevi, 287pp ISBN
Tavcan: savaş yıllarında kültür devrimi roman (2005) Remzi Kitabevi, 221pp
Başın Öne Eğilmesin: Sabahattin Ali'nin romanı (2006) Remzi Kitabevi, 264pp
Özgürlüğe Kurşun (2007) Edition Orient, 254pp , 
Kara çığlık: Afrika'da başkaldırı ve aşk (2008) Remzi Kitabevi, 228pp ,

References

1923 births
Galatasaray High School alumni
Istanbul University Faculty of Law alumni
University of Strasbourg alumni
Turkish journalists
UNICEF people
Turkish civil servants
20th-century travel writers
Turkish travel writers
Turkish novelists
Turkish non-fiction writers
Turkish biographers
Academic staff of Anadolu University
Academic staff of Galatasaray University
Academic staff of Istanbul University
Living people
Turkish officials of the United Nations
Turkish expatriates in France
Turkish centenarians
Men centenarians